The 1962 Taça de Portugal Final was the final match of the 1961–62 Taça de Portugal, the 22nd season of the Taça de Portugal, the premier Portuguese football cup competition organized by the Portuguese Football Federation (FPF). The match was played on 1 July 1962 at the Estádio Nacional in Oeiras, and opposed two Primeira Liga sides: Benfica and Vitória de Setúbal. Benfica defeated Vitória de Setúbal 3–0 to claim the Taça de Portugal for an eleventh time.

Match

Details

References

1962
Taca
S.L. Benfica matches
Vitória F.C. matches